Brown FK, also called Kipper Brown, Chocolate Brown FK, and C.I. Food Brown 1, is a brown mixture of six synthetic azo dyes, with addition of sodium chloride, and/or sodium sulfate. It is very soluble in water. When used as a food dye, its E number is E154. 

It was once used in smoked and cured mackerels and other fish and also in some cooked hams and other meats. It gave a "healthy" color that did not fade during cooking, nor leach.

It is currently not approved for use in the European Union (but was allowed to color kippers to produce orange kippers), in Australia, Austria, Canada, United States, Japan, Switzerland, New Zealand, Norway, and Russia.

In 2011, a review by the European Food Safety Authority concluded that Brown FK was no longer used and the Authority could not conclude on the safety of the substance due to the deficiencies in the available toxicity data. Therefore, it should not be included in the Union list of approved food additives.

Components
The dyes it contains are:
 4-(2,4-diaminophenylazo)benzenesulfonate, sodium salt
 4-(4,6-diamino-m-tolylazo)benzenesulfonate, sodium salt
 4,4'-(4,6-diamino-1,3-phenylenebisazo)-di(benzenesulfonate), disodium salt
 4,4'-(2,4-diamino-1,3-phenylenebisazo)-di(benzenesulfonate), disodium salt
 4,4'-(2,4-diamino-5-methyl-1,3-phenylenebisazo)-di(benzenesulfonate), disodium salt
 4,4',4''-(2,4-diaminobenzene-1,3,5-trisazo)-tri(benzenesulfonate), trisodium salt

References

Food colorings
Azo dyes